Jørgen Martinius Jensen (1 January 1878 – 31 March 1970) was a Norwegian military officer and sports official. He was born in Kristiania and competed at the 1912 Summer Olympics in Stockholm, where he placed 26th in individual jumping.

He headed the Norges Landsforbund for Idrett from 1930 to 1932 and the Norwegian Equestrian Federation from 1936 to 1940. By profession he was a military officer, with the rank of colonel. He headed Opland dragonregiment, a dragoon regiment, from 1934 to 1943, and was as such involved in battles of the Norwegian Campaign, among others at Åsmarka and Tretten. After the war, from 1946 to 1956, he worked in the Norwegian Armed Forces department of war history.

References

1878 births
1970 deaths
Norwegian Army personnel of World War II
20th-century Norwegian historians
Norwegian sports executives and administrators
Writers from Oslo
Equestrians at the 1912 Summer Olympics
Olympic equestrians of Norway
Norwegian male equestrians